Clare Wigfall (born 1976 in Greenwich, London) is a British writer who currently divides her time between Prague and Berlin. Her debut collection of short stories The Loudest Sound and Nothing was published by Faber and Faber in 2007 to critical acclaim.

Biography
Wigfall grew up in Berkeley, California, before moving back to London, and she began writing at an early age. She was educated at James Allen's Girls' School, and after an early role as assistant and editor to the late President of Mensa, she graduated from the University of Manchester in 1998. She received an MA in creative writing from the University of East Anglia. At age 21, Faber and Faber offered her a book contract, based on reading a single story she had written. She worked on her debut collection for almost a decade.

Wigfall has claimed that music was a large influence on her writing of the debut collection. She mentions such various influences as the Dirty Three, John Fahey, Jolie Holland, Bonnie "Prince" Billy, Jefferson Airplane, Cat Power, Bach, Rachel's and Six Organs of Admittance each influencing one of the stories.

Her stories have been published in Prospect, New Writing 10, Tatler, new anthology X-24: unclassified and The Dublin Review and commissioned for BBC Radio 4.

In 2008, she won the BBC National Short Story Award for 'The Numbers', one of the stories from her collection.
She was also longlisted for the 2008 Frank O’Connor International Short Story Award.

In 2011, she published picture book Has anyone seen my Chihuahua? and was the BookTrust's fifth online Writer in Residence.

References

1976 births
Living people
People educated at James Allen's Girls' School
Alumni of the University of Manchester
Alumni of the University of East Anglia
British women short story writers